John Martel may refer to:

John Martel (pirate), English pirate
John Martel, St Michael and All Angels Church, Llanfihangel Rogiet
John Martel (novelist), American lawyer and novelist